The 2018 Samford Bulldogs football team represented Samford University in the 2018 NCAA Division I FCS football season. They were led by fourth-year head coach Chris Hatcher and played their home games at Seibert Stadium. They were a member of the Southern Conference (SoCon). They finished the season 6–5, 5–3 in SoCon play to finish in fourth place.

Previous season
The Bulldogs finished the 2017 season 8–4, 6–2 in SoCon play to finish in a tie for second place. They received an at-large bid to the FCS Playoffs, where they lost to Kennesaw State in the first round..

Preseason

Award watch lists

Preseason media poll
The SoCon released their preseason media poll on July 25, 2018, with the Bulldogs predicted to finish as SoCon champions. The same day the coaches released their preseason poll with the Bulldogs also predicted to finish as SoCon champions.

Preseason All-SoCon Teams
The Bulldogs placed seven players on the all-SoCon teams. Quarterback Devlin Hodges was selected as preseason offensive player of the year and Defensive lineman Ahmad Gooden was selected as preseason defensive player of the year.

Offense

1st team

Devlin Hodges – QB

Nick Nixon – OL

Kelvin McKnight – WR

2nd team

Chris Shelling – WR

Defense

1st team

Ahmad Gooden – DL

2nd team

Christian Stark – LB

Darius Harvey – DB

Schedule

Game summaries

Shorter

at Florida State

Mercer

at Chattanooga

at Kennesaw State

Western Carolina

VMI

at Furman

Wofford

at The Citadel

at East Tennessee State

Ranking movements

References

Samford
Samford Bulldogs football seasons
Samford Bulldogs football